Al-Difaa Al-Jawi Sport Club is an Iraqi football team based in Baghdad, that plays in Iraq Division Three.

History

In Premier League
Al-Difaa Al-Jawi team played in the Iraqi Premier League for the first time in the 1999–2000 season, and it lasted for six seasons in the Premier League until the 2004–05 season, at the end of which it was relegated to the Iraq Division One. The team played its first four seasons in the name of Al-Difaa Al-Jawi, and in the last two seasons in the league the name of the club was changed, and it played in the league under the name Al-Estiqlal.

Re-establishment
After the team's exit from the Iraqi Premier League in 2005, its sports activities were suspended and the situation continued until 2021, when the club was re-established in that year under its first name (Al-Difaa Al-Jawi) and a new administrative body was elected, and multiple sports teams were formed, including the football team, which is currently playing in the Iraq Division Three.

Managerial history

  Hakeem Shaker (1997–1999)
  Saleh Radhi (1999–2002)
  Salam Hashim (2002–2003)
  Haitham Kadhim (2022–present)

Famous players
Younis Abed Ali 
Ali Mutashar 
Wissam Zaki 
Samal Saeed 
Samer Saeed

Honours

Al-Quds International Championship
Winner (1): 1999

References

External links
 Al-Difaa Al-Jawi SC on Goalzz.com
 Iraq Clubs- Foundation Dates

1994 establishments in Iraq
Association football clubs established in 1994
Football clubs in Baghdad
Sport in Baghdad